Terence 'Terry' J Bartlett (born 2 December 1963) is a male retired English gymnast.

Gymnastics career
Bartlett was educated at The Mountbatten School And Language College in Romsey, Hampshire. At the age of 17, Bartlett moved to the United States, where, after graduating, he was offered a scholarship to Pennsylvania State University. He competed for Great Britain at the Olympic Games in 1984, 1988, and 1992, captaining the gymnastics team at the latter event.

He represented England and won a silver medal in the team event, at the 1990 Commonwealth Games in Auckland, New Zealand.

Later career
He has since been performing with the Canadian circus troupe Cirque du Soleil. He trained Charlize Theron for her part in the movie Aeon Flux, and is a former boyfriend of Gabby Logan's sister.

See also
List of Pennsylvania State University Olympians

References

1963 births
Living people
British male artistic gymnasts
Pennsylvania State University alumni
Gymnasts at the 1984 Summer Olympics
Gymnasts at the 1988 Summer Olympics
Gymnasts at the 1992 Summer Olympics
Commonwealth Games silver medallists for England
Commonwealth Games medallists in gymnastics
Gymnasts at the 1990 Commonwealth Games
Olympic gymnasts of Great Britain
Penn State Nittany Lions men's gymnasts
Medallists at the 1990 Commonwealth Games